Bellaspira clarionensis is a species of sea snail, a marine gastropod mollusk in the family Drilliidae.

Description
The height of the shell attains 13.5 mm, its diameter 5.9 mm.

Distribution
This species occurs in the Pacific Ocean from Mexico to Panama.

References

External links
 
 McLean, James H., and Leroy H. Poorman. Reinstatement of the turrid genus Bellaspira Conrad, 1868 (Mollusca: Gastropoda) with a review of the known species. Los Angeles County Museum of Natural History, 1970

clarionensis
Gastropods described in 1970